Alma Park is a farming area closely associated with the Pleasant Hills township situated about 17 kilometres to its north.  It is a part of the Greater Hume Shire Local Government Area.  While it is listed in some maps and other documents as a town, it is nothing more than an area of settlement that in some cases is referred to jointly with Pleasant Hills, for example the Alma Park/Pleasant Hills Landcare Group 

Other than private properties that farm both wheat and similar grain crops and cattle, the only obvious indication of the location of Alma Park is an old Lutheran church that still exists on the Alma Park–Pleasant Hills Road.

German settlement
Alma Park has close links with the Pleasant Hills community particularly with regard to its Wendish German (Lutheran) heritage when a large group of these settlers arrived in the 1880s.  At the time Alma Park was referred to as Wallendool.

Greendale Post Office opened on 1 July 1875, was renamed Alma Park in 1905 and closed in 1910.

Notes and references

Towns in the Riverina
Towns in New South Wales
Lockhart Shire